Hynek Berka of Dubá (c. 1297 – 1348) was a Bohemian knight and founder of the Berka of Dubá aristocracy line. In 1320 he had the Kokořín Castle built.

Relatives
Adam Berka of Dubá
Zbyněk Berka of Dubá

References

14th-century Bohemian people